Den danske Mercurius was a Danish newspaper, first published on 1 August 1666, by Anders Bording. He founded his versified newspaper, published in Danish with the title Den Danske Mercurius. The newspaper was published on the order of the Sovereign. Its publishing was a turning point in the history of Danish journalism.

It was published on a monthly basis with two quarto pages. It contained domestic and international news written in Alexandrine verse style, accompanied by reasoning in the form of small poems.

Regarding the messages from Denmark itself, news from the Royal Danish court took up the most space, but many other news topics were mentioned too, e.g. the arrival of foreign diplomats, appointments, meteorological phenomena and fires.

The name of the newspaper, Mercurius, referred to the messenger of the gods in Greek and Roman mythology, and had already been used for foreign newspapers, (e.g. the Mercure Francais from 1605), but in its form the Danish newspaper was an imitation of the versed La muze historique, which Jean Loret wrote for mademoiselle de Longueville, later the Duchess of Nemours, from 1650.

Den Danske Mercurius continued its published for 14 years after the 1677 death of its founder, Bording, but its quality was diminished due to the lack of its founder's talent. After 1677, it was published by Jesper Als and Ahasverus Bartholin.

References
 Den Danske Mercurius, C.A. Reitzels Forlag, 1984. . Fotografisk reproduktion af alle årgangene af avisen. 
 Den Danske Mercurius 1666–1677, Munksgaard, 1973. . Udvalg af Den Danske Mercurius. 
 P.M. Stolpe - Dagspressen i Danmark, bind 2, Rosenkilde og Bagger, 1977, s. 31–65. Fotografisk reproduktion af udgaven fra 1879. 
 Jette D. Søllinge & Niels Thomsen, De danske aviser, bind 1, Odense Universitetsforlag, 1988. . s. 77–79..

Defunct newspapers published in Denmark
1666 establishments in Denmark
Publications established in 1666